Shaidan may refer to:
Shaitan, Islamic Satan
Asht or Shaidan, a town in Tajikistan

See also
Shahidan, Iran (disambiguation)
Shaytan (disambiguation)